Helen Niña Tappan Loeblich (October 12, 1917 – August 18, 2004) was an American micropaleontologist who was a professor of geology at the University of California, Los Angeles, a United States Geological Survey (USGS) biostratigrapher, and a scientific illustrator whose micropaleontology specialty was research on Cretaceous foraminifera.

Early life 
Dr Helen Nina Tappan Leoblich was born on October 12, 1917, in Norman, Oklahoma. She came from a well-educated background. Her mother Mary Pearl Jenks Tappan was a math teacher at Cornell, and her father, Frank Girard Tappan, was a Dean of Electrical Engineering at the University of Oklahoma.

Education 
Tappan Loeblich earned her BS in 1937 and her Master's in 1939, both in geology from the University of Oklahoma. Her master's thesis was on mid-Cretaceous foraminifera of Oklahoma and Texas. At the University of Oklahoma, she met her future husband and long time scientific collaborator, Alfred R. Loeblich Jr, in chemistry class, in 1939.  Shortly thereafter they married and spent their honeymoon doing field work with their graduate advisor, in south-central Oklahoma,

Leoblich received her Ph.D. in 1942 from the University of Chicago, and her dissertation continued her master's work. When her husband was drafted in 1942, Tappan Loeblich became the first female professor at Tulane University's College of Arts and Sciences. In 1953 she was awarded a Guggenheim Fellowship to allow her to take a sabbatical from her USGS appointment and travel to Europe to collect foraminifera with her husband.

Research 
While working on the Treatise on Invertebrate Paleontology, Tappan Loeblich's research partner and husband Alfred was stationed in Europe by the Smithsonian Institution, in order to do further research on Foraminiferal samples seen in European museums, and those he collected in the field. Due to the USGS and their policy of not allowing work outside of the US, Tappan Loeblich took a leave of absence in order to join her husband in Europe. During their travels, the pair collected many samples, and greatly extended their knowledge on Foraminifera.

Tappan Loeblich was known for her studies of Foraminifera, a single-celled organism that is capable of producing a shell called a test, usually made out of organic compounds, sand grains, and calcium carbonate depending on the species. The shells divide into chambers during growth, similar to the Ammonite. Foraminifera are useful in terms of biostratigraphy, as they show fairly significant evolutionally development, so different subspecies are found at different times. 

Tappan Loeblich became an honorary research associate of the Smithsonian institution, and moved to California to pursue a career with the University of California, where in 1966, she became a full time faculty member, and then the vice chairman of geology from 1973 to 1975. Her husband Alfred began work on a micropaleontological program at Chevron Oil Field Research Company.

Publications 
With her husband, Tappan Loeblich is the author of two major works on foraminiferal classification, two volumes in the Treatise on Invertebrate Paleontology Part C. Protista 2 (Sarcodina, Chiefly "Thecamoebians" and Foraminiferida), Volumes 1 and 2 (1964) by USGS and the University of Kansas and their two-volume work, Foraminiferal Genera and Their Classification, published in 1988 by Springer. The Treatise classified foraminifera genera by the morphology of their external tests or shells, and Foraminiferal Genera revised and refined the classification of forams by adding test internal characteristics and reviewing type specimens.

Awards 
Tappan Loeblich received the Paleontological Society Medal in 1983, the Woman of the Year Award in Natural Science from the Palm Springs Desert Museum in 1987, the Raymond C. Moore Medal for “Excellence in Paleontology” in 1984, and the 1982 Woman of Science Award from the UCLA Medical Center Auxiliary.

Tappan Loeblich also worked on numerous editorial and society boards. She published a total of 272 scientific papers or books mainly with her husband. One of their most notable works was their 1957 paper “Correlation of the Gulf and Atlantic Coastal Plain Paleocene and lower Eocene formations by means of planktonic Foraminifera” which won the Best Paper Award in the Journal of Paleontology. Her book, “The Paleobiology of Plant Protists” (1980), was also voted “the best non-fiction book” for that year.

Contributions to Science 
Tappan Loeblich became an important figure in the Paleontology community. Apart from her outstanding accomplishments in Geology and Paleontology; the time she spent teaching at UCLA, she mentored and inspired numerous students. Many of whom went on pursuing and achieving prominence in geology, palynology, paleontology, and micropaleontology. She had also worked on numerous editorial and society boards.

Tappan Loeblich is also known for her books and landmark paper, as well as her prodigious scientific output, Both as a sole author and collaborator.

Tappan Loeblich instilled in her students' a strong work ethic and commitment to try and be the best versions of themselves. Aside from publishing award-winning papers and books, Helen would often put her work down and help her students with their research. Her contributions to the community were not restricted to paleontology or geology but also to share her expertise and advising future students who would later continue her example and work to improve the paleontology community in the future.

Later life and death 
Most of Loeblich's achievements were accomplished alongside her husband and fellow researcher Alfred R. Loeblich Jr., whom she met in the University of Oklahoma, during her Master of Science degree in 1939. They married on June 18 of the same year, and had four children including Alfred Richard leoblich III, who took a doctorate in botany at the Scripps Institution of Oceanography. Tappan Loeblich's husband took up a teaching post at Tulane's College of Arts and Sciences in New Orleans, and was drafted into the US military in 1942. She taught in his stead, and became the first woman faculty member in the faculty's history.

After the war, Tappan Loeblich and her husband moved to Washington D.C., where they began new lines of research.

Both Tappan Loeblich and Her husband toured different countries including Europe, Eastern Europe, China, and Japan upon many government and university requests. When her husband was diagnosed with Alzheimer's, She retired early from UCLA in 1984 to care for her husband for almost 10yrs without any support, even though she had been through distress and had suffered from dementia. Tappan Loeblich and her husband were married after 55years when Alfred died of Alzheimer’s in 1994.

Loeblich developed a stroke just a year after her husband’s death on their fifty sixth anniversary. She was admitted to the hospital on August 15, what would have been her husband’s 90th birthday, and died three days later August 18, 2004 in California at age 86.

References

American paleontologists
Women paleontologists
University of Oklahoma alumni
University of Chicago alumni
1917 births
2004 deaths
People from Norman, Oklahoma
University of California, Los Angeles faculty
Micropaleontologists
20th-century American women scientists
20th-century American scientists
21st-century American women